Münir Recep Aktaş (born 26 June 1989) is a Turkish freestyle wrestler competing in the 65 kg division. He is a member of Ankara ASKİ.

Career 
In 2022, he won one of the bronze medals in the men's 65 kg event at the European Wrestling Championships held in Budapest, Hungary.

He lost his bronze medal match in the 65 kg event at the 2022 Mediterranean Games held in Oran, Algeria.

Major results

References

External links 
 

Living people
Turkish male sport wrestlers
1989 births
European Wrestling Championships medalists
Competitors at the 2022 Mediterranean Games
Mediterranean Games competitors for Turkey
21st-century Turkish people